Janet Elizabeth Estévez ( Templeton; born July 8, 1944), known professionally as Janet Sheen and Janet Templeton, is an American actress.

Biography
She studied art at the New School for Social Research in New York City where she met her future husband Martin Sheen. They married in December 1961.
She is the mother of four children, three sons and one daughter, all of whom are actors, Emilio Estevez, Renée Estevez, Ramon Estevez, and Charlie Sheen. In 1983 she played Elaine de Kooning in the miniseries Kennedy. She also appeared in the film Rated X as a nurse, though she was not mentioned in the final credits. In 1989, she was associate producer of the film Beverly Hills Brats, and in 2010, executive producer of The Way.

References

External links
 

1944 births

Living people

Estevez family

The New School alumni
Actresses from Dayton, Ohio